The religious affiliation in the United States Senate reflects the variety of religion in the United States, despite not being in line with the religious affiliation of the general population.

While the religious preference of elected officials is by no means an indication of their allegiance nor necessarily reflective of their voting record, the religious affiliation of prominent members of all three branches of government is a source of commentary and discussion among the media and public. The topic is also of interest to religious groups and the general public who may appeal to senators of their denomination on religious or moral issues facing the United States Senate.

Current United States senators
The following list reports the religious affiliation of the members of the United States Senate in the 118th United States Congress. In most cases, besides specific sources, the senators' religious affiliations are those mentioned in the latest research by the Pew Forum on Religion and Public Life at the Pew Research Center, which publishes a report at the beginning of each Congress.

Christians (85)

Protestants (55)

Presbyterians (11)

Baptists (10)

Methodists (6)

Lutherans (6)

Episcopalians (5)

Nondenominational Evangelicals (5)

Restorationists (3)

Congregationalists (2)

Pentecostals (2)

Wesleyan-Holiness Evangelicals (1)

Quakers (1)

Unspecified Protestants (3)

Catholics (27)

Latter-day Saints (3)

Jewish (9)

Buddhists (1)

Unknown or refused to specify (4)

Unaffiliated (1)

Comparison with general population
In conjunction with figures derived from the Pew Research Center's 2021 "survey of the religious composition of the United States", the most basic breakdown of the above data indicates that 85% of the Senate identify as Christian (compared with 63% of the population), 9% identify as Jewish (compared with 2% of the population), 3% have unknown religious affiliation or refused to specify it (compared with 2% of the population), 1% identifies with other religions (compared with 5% of the population), and another 1% identifies as unaffiliated (compared with 29% of the population). The unaffiliated are extremely under-represented, while Jews, Presbyterians, Lutherans, and Episcopalians are particularly over-represented.

The following table compares reported religious affiliations of senators to religious statistics of the demographics of the United States:

See also
 Religion in the United States
 Demographics of the United States
 Chaplain of the United States Senate
 Chaplain of the United States House of Representatives
 Religious affiliation in the United States House of Representatives
 Religious affiliations of presidents of the United States
 Religious affiliations of vice presidents of the United States

References

External links
 Catholics in the Public Square
 Jewish Members of Congress National Jewish Democratic Committee (List of Jewish Americans who are Democrats or Independents) 
 Episcopalians in the Senate and the Federal Marriage Amendment

History of religion in the United States
United States Senate
Lists of United States senators
US Senate
United States Senate